Duchess of Buccleuch is the title given to the wife of the Duke of Buccleuch, but may also be held by a woman in her own right. The title has been held by a number of women, including:

Duchess in her own right
Anne Scott, 1st Duchess of Buccleuch (1651–1732)

By marriage
Elizabeth Scott, Duchess of Buccleuch (1743–1827) (1743–1827), wife of Henry Scott, 3rd Duke of Buccleuch
Charlotte Montagu Douglas Scott, Duchess of Buccleuch (1811–1895), wife of Walter Montagu Douglas Scott, 5th Duke of Buccleuch
Louisa Montagu Douglas Scott, Duchess of Buccleuch (1836–1912), wife of William Montagu Douglas Scott, 6th Duke of Buccleuch
Mary Montagu Douglas Scott, Duchess of Buccleuch (1900–1993), wife of Walter Montagu Douglas Scott, 8th Duke of Buccleuch
Jane Scott, Duchess of Buccleuch (1929–2011), wife of John Scott, 9th Duke of Buccleuch
Elizabeth Scott, Duchess of Buccleuch (born 1954), wife of Richard Scott, 10th Duke of Buccleuch

Other uses
, several ships with that name